The 1932 Pacific Southwest Championships was a combined men's and women's amateur tennis tournament played on outdoor hard courts at the Los Angeles Tennis Club in Los Angeles, California in the United States. It was the sixth edition of the tournament and took place from September 16 through September 26, 1932. Fred Perry and Anna McCune Harper won the singles titles.

Finals

Men's singles
 Fred Perry  defeated  Jiro Satoh 6–2, 6–4, 7–5

Women's singles
 Anna McCune Harper defeated  Alice Marble 10–8, 6–3

Men's doubles
 Wilmer Allison /  John Van Ryn defeated  Keith Gledhill /  Ellsworth Vines 6–3, 6–4, 6–4

Women's doubles
 Carolin Babcock /  Sarah Palfrey defeated  Anna McCune Harper /  Alice Marble 6–2, 7–9, 7–5

Mixed doubles
 Sarah Palfrey /  Fred Perry defeated  Anna McCune Harper /  Jiro Satoh 6–3, 6–2

References

Los Angeles Open (tennis)
Pacific Southwest Championships
Pacific Southwest Championships